"God's Not Done With You" is a song by American Christian pop artist Tauren Wells. It was released on April 5, 2019, as the sixth single from his debut studio album, Hills and Valleys (2017). Wells co-wrote the song with Bernie Herms and Emily Weisband, with production being handled by Bernie Herms. The song peaked at No. 6 on the US Hot Christian Songs chart, registering as his fifth top ten single.

Background
In July 2017, Tauren Wells, in a special interview where he spoke about the songs on his album, Hills and Valleys (2017), with Caitlin Lassiter of NewReleaseToday. Sharing the story behind "God's Not Done With You", Wells said: 
In another NewReleaseToday interview, with Jake Frederick, Wells stated that the song would be his next single, having reworked the song with producer Bernie Herms. The song impacted Christian radio in April 2018.

Composition
"God's Not Done With You" is a pop song, composed in the key of D-flat major with a tempo of 140 beats per minute. Wells' vocal range spans from G♭3 to D♭5.

Music video
The official music video of "God's Not Done With You" was availed on Tauren Wells' YouTube channel on May 10, 2019. It features Wells performing the song on a piano in a burning field with scenes of people dealing with difficult situations such as ill-health and marital troubles. The music video garnered over 14 million views as of October 2020.

Accolades

Track listing

Charts

Weekly charts

Year-end charts

Release history

References

2017 songs
2019 singles
Tauren Wells songs
Songs written by Emily Weisband
Songs written by Bernie Herms
Songs written by Tauren Wells